Creation is a hymn tune composed by William Billings.

History

Billings included Creation in his final collection, The Continental Harmony (published in 1794).  The words are by Isaac Watts: the first stanza is from Psalm 139 and the second from hymn 19, book 2, of his Hymns.  In 2002, historian of science Edward B. Davis (co-editor of The Works of Robert Boyle) discovered that Watts based the second stanza on a meditation by the famous chemist Robert Boyle. In that text, from Occasional Reflections Upon Several Subjects (1665), Boyle reflected on an illness from which he had recovered, noting the great complexity of the human body and the wonder of how it all stays so well for so many years.

Words

See also
 Africa (William Billings), hymn tune with music score
 Chester (song), an American Revolutionary War anthem

References

External links
Free PDF of the music, as well as a MIDI file
Performance of the song by His Majestie's Clerkes on amazon.com

Hymn tunes
1794 compositions
Compositions by William Billings